USS Michael Monsoor (DDG-1001) is the second ship of the three-ship  of guided missile destroyers. The Zumwalt-class was designed as a multi-mission surface combatant for land attack and littoral operations with a mission of supporting both ground campaigns and the joint/naval battlespace. The main guns are a pair of Advanced Gun Systems (AGS). The Navy cancelled the ammunition procurement program for the only type of ammunition it can use, so the AGS cannot provide naval gunfire support and the Zumwalts were repurposed for surface warfare.

Design 
Michael Monsoor is the second Zumwalt-class destroyer.

Namesake

Michael Monsoor is named after Master-at-Arms Second Class Michael A. Monsoor (1981–2006), a United States Navy SEAL killed during the Iraq War and posthumously awarded the Medal of Honor.

Construction and career
Assembly of modules for Michael Monsoor began in March 2010. The keel laying and authentication ceremony for Michael Monsoor was held at the General Dynamics-Bath Iron Works shipyard on 23 May 2013. Michael Monsoor was launched on 21 June 2016.

Electrical failure during trials
On 4 December 2017, Michael Monsoor had problems with the complex electrical system which ended builders' trials early and forced the ship to return to the General Dynamics Bath Iron Works shipyard in Maine. A harmonic filter aboard failed one day after she left the yard. The ship returned to the yard on 5 December 2017. Harmonic filters are used in complex electrical systems to prevent unintended power fluctuations from damaging sensitive equipment. The delay in sea trials would not affect her expected March 2018 delivery.

Service with the U.S. Navy
The Navy chose to use an unusual two-part commissioning scheme for the Zumwalt-class. The initial commissioning was done prior to weapons systems integration, and the ships were placed in the status of "in commission, special", before sailing to San Diego for weapons installation and final acceptance. Zumwalt and Michael Monsoor used this scheme, while the third and final ship in the class, Lyndon B. Johnson, will use the more traditional approach with formal commissioning after final acceptance.

Michael Monsoor was delivered to the Navy in April 2018, and commissioned on 26 January 2019, at Naval Air Station North Island. She is homeported at Naval Base San Diego. Chief of Naval Operations Admiral Mike Gilday visited Michael Monsoor while in San Diego on 25 February 2021.

Michael Monsoor participated in RIMPAC 2022.

Gallery

See also
 Mountain Warfare Training Camp Michael Monsoor

References 

 Attribution

External links
 
 NavSource: USS Michael Monsoor (DDG-1001)
 USS Monsoor, May 2013

 

2016 ships
Zumwalt-class destroyers